Jonathan Leroy Ledbetter (born September 12, 1997) is an American football defensive end for the Arizona Cardinals of the National Football League (NFL). He played college football for Georgia.

Early life and high school
Ledbetter grew up in Tucker, Georgia and attended Tucker High School. He was considered by most scouting services to be a top ten defensive end in his class and was selected to play in the 2015 Under Armour All-America Game. Ledbetter initially committed to play college football for the University of Alabama, but de-committed and decided to play at the University of Georgia.

College career
Ledbetter played four seasons for the Georgia Bulldogs. After serving a suspension for the first six games of the season stemming from off the field issues, He entered the starting lineup during his sophomore year and finished the season with 24 tackles and a sack in seven games played. As a junior, making 38 tackles (5.5 for loss) with 2.5 sacks in 15 games (11 starts) in Georgia's run to the Playoff National Championship Game. In his senior season, Ledbetter led all Georgia defensive linemen with 56 tackles and finished second on the team with 6.5 tackles for loss with a sack and two forced fumbles and was named second-team All-Southeastern Conference by the league's coaches. He finished his collegiate career with 122 total tackles, 14.5 tackles for loss, 4.5 sacks, and 2 forced fumbles. Following the end his final season, Ledbetter received an invitation to play in the 2019 Senior Bowl.

Professional career

Miami Dolphins
Ledbetter signed with the Miami Dolphins as an undrafted free agent on April 27, 2019 and made the team out of training camp. Ledbetter made his NFL debut on September 8, 2019, starting at defensive end and making four tackles with a combined sack in a 59-10 loss to the Baltimore Ravens. He was placed on injured reserve on September 12, 2019. He was waived with a non-football injury designation on April 21, 2020, and reverted to the team's reserve/non-football injury list the next day.

On August 31, 2021, Ledbetter was waived by the Dolphins.

Arizona Cardinals
On September 3, 2021, Ledbetter was signed to the Arizona Cardinals practice squad. On February 9, 2022, Ledbetter signed a reserve/future contract.

Ledbetter made the Cardinals roster in 2022 as a backup defensive end. He played in 14 games with three starts, recording 22 tackles and one sack.

Personal
Ledbetter's older brother, Joseph, played basketball at Pfeiffer University for two years before transferring Georgia and joining the Bulldogs football team as a tight end.

Ledbetter was arrested on March 20, 2016 for possession fake ID and underage possession of alcohol. The charges were later dropped, but he was originally suspended for the Georgia's season opener. That same offseason, Ledbetter was arrest for driven under the influence on July 10, 2016 after he was found asleep behind the wheel of his car by police. He was suspended indefinitely by head coach Kirby Smart, missing the first six games of the 2016 season before being reinstated by the program on October 11, 2016 after completing an education, counseling and medical assistance program.

References

External links 
 Arizona Cardinals bio
 Georgia Bulldogs bio

1997 births
Living people
American football defensive ends
Arizona Cardinals players
Georgia Bulldogs football players
Miami Dolphins players
People from Tucker, Georgia
Players of American football from Georgia (U.S. state)
Sportspeople from DeKalb County, Georgia
Tucker High School alumni
Under Armour All-American football players